Monte Vermelho is a settlement in the southeastern part of the island of Fogo, Cape Verde. It is situated 3 km east of Fonte Aleixo, 3 km southwest of Figueira Pavão, 6 km southwest of Cova Figueira and 19 km southeast of the island capital São Filipe. At the 2010 census its population was 221. Its elevation is about 400 meters.

See also
List of villages and settlements in Cape Verde

References

Villages and settlements in Fogo, Cape Verde
Santa Catarina do Fogo